Jubilee Auditorium is the name of:

Northern Alberta Jubilee Auditorium in Edmonton
Southern Alberta Jubilee Auditorium in Calgary